John Bright (1888 – June 24, 1908) was an American Negro league pitcher in the 1900s.

Bright played for the Cuban Giants in 1907. In three recorded appearances on the mound, he posted a 1.61 ERA over 28 innings. Bright died in Cleveland, Ohio in 1908 at age 19 or 20.

References

External links
Baseball statistics and player information from Baseball-Reference Black Baseball Stats and Seamheads

1888 births
1908 deaths
Date of birth missing
Place of birth missing
Cuban Giants players
20th-century African-American people